Cribrarula garciai is a species of sea snails, a cowry, a marine gastropod mollusc in the family Cypraeidae, the cowries.

Description

Cribarula garciai has a leopard print arrangement of colored spots on the dorsal face of the shell. The spots become white on the dorsum while the background becomes brown. The leopard spots begin to fade on the ventral face of the shell.

Distribution
Easter Island ( Rapa Nui, Chile)

References

External links

Cypraeidae
Gastropods described in 2001
Endemic fauna of Chile